Eyn ol Rrum (also Romanized as ‘Eyn ol Rrūm and ‘Eyn or Rūm) is a village in Dasht-e Bil Rural District, in the Central District of Oshnavieh County, West Azerbaijan Province, Iran. At the 2006 census, its population was 105, in 25 families.

References 

Populated places in Oshnavieh County